The Town Ground is a cricket and football ground in the town of Heanor, Derbyshire, England. For cricket, the ground is the home of Heanor Town CC, and has also been used by Derbyshire CCC in the 1970s and 1980s, mostly for limited-over matches. It has hosted five List A matches and one first-class fixture.

The Town Ground is also home to the football team, Heanor Town F.C.

Game Information:	
{| class="wikitable"
|-
! Game Type
! No. of Games
|-
| County Championship Matches
| 1
|-
| Limited-over county matches
| 8
|-
| Twenty20 matches
| 0
|}

Game Statistics: first-class:
{| class="wikitable"
|-
! Category
! Information
|-
| Highest Team Score
| Hampshire (349/2dec against Derbyshire) in 1987
|-
| Lowest Team Score
| Hampshire (261/6dec against Derbyshire) in 1987
|-
| Best Batting Performance
| Bruce Roberts (106 Runs for Derbyshire against Hampshire in 1987
|-
| Best Bowling Performance
| Rajesh Maru (4/123 for Hampshire against Derbyshire) in 1987
|}

Game Statistics: one-day matches:
{| class="wikitable"
|-
! Category
! Information
|-
| Highest Team Score
| Gloucestershire (258/8 in 40 overs against Derbyshire) in 1988
|-
| Lowest Team Score
| Gloucestershire Cricket Board (172 in 43.3 overs against Derbyshire Cricket Board) in 2000
|-
| Best Batting Performance
| Kim Barnett (100 Runs for Derbyshire against Somerset) in 1983, Kim Barnett (100 Runs for Derbyshire against Glamorgan) in 1989 and John Morris (100 Runs for Derbyshire against Glamorgan) in 1989
|-
| Best Bowling Performance
| Cardigan Connor (4/25 for Hampshire against Derbyshire) in 1986
|}

External links
 Cricinfo Website – Ground Page
 Cricket Archive page

Cricket grounds in Derbyshire
Football venues in Derbyshire
Football venues in England